The 1962–63 FA Cup was the 82nd staging of the world's oldest football cup competition, the Football Association Challenge Cup, commonly known as the FA Cup. Manchester United won the competition for only the third time, beating Leicester City 3–1 in the final at Wembley.

Matches were scheduled to be played at the stadium of the team named first on the date specified for each round, which was always a Saturday. Some matches, however, might be rescheduled for other days if there were clashes with games for other competitions or the weather was inclement. If scores were level after 90 minutes had been played, a replay would take place at the stadium of the second-named team later the same week. If the replayed match was drawn further replays would be held until a winner was determined. If scores were level after 90 minutes had been played in a replay, a 30-minute period of extra time would be played.

Calendar

Results

First round proper

At this stage clubs from the Football League Third and Fourth Divisions joined those non-league clubs having come through the qualifying rounds with the exception of Crook Town and Hounslow Town, who given byes to this round. Matches were scheduled to be played on Saturday, 3 November 1962. Nine were drawn and went to replays.

Second round 
The matches were scheduled for Saturday, 24 November 1962. Two matches were drawn, with replays taking place later the same week.

Third round 
The 44 First and Second Division clubs entered the competition at this stage. The matches were scheduled for Saturday, 5 January 1963, but due to the Big Freeze of 1963, only three games were completed at this date. The bulk of matches were not completable until February and March, with the final non-replay tie being played on the 7 March. There were nine replays in total, of which the earliest possible playing date was 30 January, and the latest the 11 March.

Fourth round 
The matches were originally scheduled for Saturday, 26 January 1963, but due to the earlier, ongoing problems with the winter of 1963, most of the third-round games had still not been played and only one tie, the Burnley – Liverpool match, was able to be played on that day. This and three other games went to a replay, with the Portsmouth – Coventry City match requiring a second replay, which was the last match of the round.

Fifth round 
The matches were originally scheduled for Saturday, 16 February 1963, but the delays of the matches in the third and fourth rounds prevented the fifth round ties from being played until much later. On 28 January, the FA announced that the draw for the fifth round would be put back a week, and that the league season would be extended until 19 May. Faced with the problem of wishing all the ties to take place on the same date, the FA decided on 4 February 1963 that the fifth and sixth rounds would each be postponed by a week to 23 February and 16 March respectively The following week, on 12 February, the FA again decided, due to the lack of completion of many games, that the fifth and sixth rounds should be postponed The agreed dates, Saturday 16 March and Saturday 30 March respectively, were the final postponements of these two rounds. There were no replays, but the Nottingham Forest and Leeds United match did not take place until the following Tuesday, while the Coventry City – Sunderland game was played on the 25th.

Sixth round

The four quarter-final ties were scheduled to be played on Saturday, 9 March 1963, but as explained above, were postponed until the 30 March. The Nottingham Forest–Southampton match went to two replays before the tie was settled, in Southampton's favour.

Semi-finals

The semi-final matches were originally scheduled to be played on Saturday, 30 March 1963. However, due to the problems of completing the earlier rounds due to the particularly inclement weather, on 18 February 1963 the FA Challenge Cup committee announced that the semi finals would be put back by four weeks to 27 April, and that the final would not be played until three weeks after its original date, on 25 May. Leicester City and Manchester United came through the semi final round to meet at Wembley.

Final

The 1963 FA Cup final was a football match played on 25 May 1963 at Wembley. The final was contested by Manchester United and Leicester City. United won 3–1, with goals by Denis Law and David Herd (2). Ken Keyworth scored the Foxes' goal.

Match details

References
General
The FA Cup Archive at TheFA.com
English FA Cup 1962/63 at Soccerbase
F.A. Cup results 1962/63 at Footballsite
Specific

 
FA Cup seasons
Fa
Eng